Scythris nylsvleyensis is a moth of the family Scythrididae. It was described by Bengt Å. Bengtsson in 2014. It is found in North West province, South Africa.

References

Endemic moths of South Africa
nylsvleyensis
Moths described in 2014